Christian David Thomas  (born 9 September 1959) is a past president of the Royal Entomological Society. He is also Director of the Leverhulme Centre for Anthropocene Biodiversity at the University of York.

He completed his first degree (BA) in Applied Biology at the University of Cambridge, followed by an MSc in Ecology at the University of Bangor and a PhD at the University of Texas at Austin. A Professor in the Department of Biology at the University of York, he also serves as director of the Leverhulme Centre for Anthropocene Biodiversity, a new £10 million transdisciplinary research centre funded for 10 years from 2019. In July 2012, he was elected as a Fellow of the Royal Society.

Selected publications
Inheritors of the Earth: How Nature Is Thriving in an Age of Extinction. 2017.

References

1959 births
Living people
20th-century British biologists
21st-century British biologists
Fellows of the Royal Entomological Society
Fellows of the Royal Society
Presidents of the Royal Entomological Society
Alumni of the University of Cambridge
Alumni of Bangor University
University of Texas at Austin alumni
Academics of the University of York